James Coombes may refer to:
 James Coombes (actor), British actor
 France v James Coombes & Co, a UK labour law case
 Jamie Coombes, Gibraltarian footballer